La Celestina is a work entirely in dialogue published in 1499.

La Celestina may also refer to:
 La Celestina (1996 film), a Spanish drama film
 The Wanton of Spain or La Celestina, a 1969 Spanish drama film
 La Celestina (opera), an opera by Flavio Testi
 La Celestina P... R..., a 1965 Italian comedy film